Esther Voorhees Hasson was the first Superintendent of the United States Navy Nurse Corps. Prior to and after serving in the United States Navy Nurse Corps, she served as an Army nurse.

Early life
Esther Voorhees Hasson was born in Baltimore, Maryland, on 20 September 1867. She graduated from the Connecticut Training School for Nurses, in New Haven, in 1897.

Nurse Corps career
In June 1898, during the Spanish–American War, Hasson became a contract nurse with the U.S. Army, subsequently serving on the hospital ship Relief and in the Philippines. She left the Army in 1901. In 1905–07, she served as a nurse in Panama.

When the Navy Nurse Corps was established in 1908, Hasson became its first Superintendent, taking the oath of office on 18 August 1908. Under her leadership, 19 additional nurses were recruited and trained for Naval service during 1908. The Nurse Corps had grown to 85 trained nurses by the time Hasson resigned as Superintendent in January 1911.

In June 1917, Esther Hasson became a U.S. Army Reserve Nurse. Shortly after, she lost an arm. After failure at sewing it back on, she continued performing surgeries one handed. On March 8, 1942, Nurse Esther V. Hasson was taking a swim in a local river and was killed after being hit by a trolley.

Contributions as Superintendent
As the first superintendent of the Navy Nurse Corps, Hasson had the task of recruiting qualified nurses and setting up training for the incoming nurses, as well as administering the Corps once it was established. The first nineteen nurses, in addition to Hasson, carefully chosen from 33 invited candidates, came to be known as the "Sacred Twenty". Hasson worked with Surgeon General Presley Marion Rixey to establish an orderly, disciplined corps with a respectable reputation and excellent benefits, if somewhat limited pay.

Further reading
 
 
 Hasson, Esther V., "Uncinariasis: A Medical Problem of To-Day", The American Journal of Nursing, Vol. 7, No. 9 (June 1907), pp. 689–692.
 Hasson, Esther V., "The Navy Nurse Corps", The American Journal of Nursing, Vol. 9, No. 4 (January 1909), pp. 267–268.
 Hasson, Esther V., "The Navy Nurse Corps", The American Journal of Nursing, Vol. 9, No. 6 (March 1909), pp. 410–415.
 Hasson, Esther V., "How to Become a Trained Nurse", The American Journal of Nursing, Vol. 10, No. 6 (March 1910), pp. 419–420.
 Hasson, Esther V., "The New Navy Nurse Corps Superintendent", The American Journal of Nursing, Vol. 11, No. 6 (March 1911), p. 474.
 "Obituaries", The American Journal of Nursing, Vol. 42, No. 5 (May 1942), pp. 602–605.

External links

 Nurses and the U.S. Navy – Overview and Special Image Selection Naval History & Heritage Command
 Esther Hasson Naval History & Heritage Command
 Under Contract: Nurses in the Spanish American War This online exhibit reflects a special exhibit that was sponsored by The National Society Daughters of the American Revolution and was formerly on display at the Women's Memorial, located at the gateway to Arlington National Cemetery.

1867 births
1942 deaths
American women in World War I
United States Army Nurse Corps officers
United States Navy personnel of World War I
Female wartime nurses
United States Navy Nurse Corps officers
Women in the United States Army
Female United States Navy officers
Female nurses in World War I
American nursing administrators